Kral Şakir ("King Şakir") is a Turkish animated television series created by Varol Yaşaroğlu, Berk Tokay and Haluk Can Dizdaroğlu and produced by Grafi2000 for Cartoon Network Turkey. The series' sneak peek premiered on April 23, 2016. It premiered officially on May 16, 2016 as Cartoon Network Turkey's first local series.

Premise 
The series tells the adventures of the lion Şakir and his friends and family, who are also anthropomorphic animals.

Series overview

Episodes

Season 1

Season 2

Cast

External links

Notes

Is currently on Middle East televisions

References

Turkish comedy television series
2010s Turkish television series
Turkish animated television series
Television shows set in Istanbul
Television series produced in Istanbul

Current Turkish television series